Joan of Arc, Dick Cheney, Mark Twain is the seventh full-length album by Joan of Arc, released in 2004. It is their first for Polyvinyl Records. It is, according to a 2018 interview, Tim Kinsella's favorite Joan of Arc album.

Track listing
 Questioning Benjamin Franklin's Ghost - 3:17
 Apocalypse Politics - 2:22
 The Title Track of This Album - 1:19
 Queasy Lynn - 2:36
 White and Wrong - 3:26
 Onomatopoepic Animal Faces - 4:20
 A Half-Deaf Girl Named Echo - 5:32
 80's Dance Parties Most Of All - 1:49
 Deep Rush - 1:56
 Gripped By The Lips - 4:15
 Fleshy Jeffrey - 4:12
 Abigail, Cops and Animals - 4:33
 "Still" From Miss Kate's Texture Dictionary 2:25
 The Details of the Bomb - 4:17
 I Trust a Litter of Kittens Still Keeps the Colosseum - 6:20
 The Telephones Have Begun Making Calls - 3:29
 The Cash In and Price - 1:09

References

Joan of Arc (band) albums
2004 albums
Polyvinyl Record Co. albums